Kanze Kojiro Nobumitsu 観世 小次郎 信光 1435 or 1450 – July 7, 1516 was a Japanese noh playwright and secondary actor during the Muromachi Era, from the house of Kanze. He was the great nephew of Noh playwright Zeami Motokiyo and is considered one of the last important playwrights of the golden age of Noh. He was the author of around 30 plays.

Among his most famous plays is the play Rashōmon, which spelled the title of the Rajōmon gate by using the kanji shō for "life" (羅生門) rather than the original jō for "castle." This reading has been corrected back in modern Japanese but left its trace in the title of later stories named Rashōmon and the film of Akira Kurosawa.

Selected plays
 Ataka
 Momijigari
 Dōjōji (uncertain attribution)
 Funa benkei
 Rashōmon
 Chōryō
 Yugyō yanagi
  Ryōko
  Kōtei
  Orochi
  Tama-no-i
  Kochō

References

Noh playwrights
1516 deaths
Year of birth unknown
15th-century Japanese dramatists and playwrights
15th-century Japanese male actors
16th-century Japanese dramatists and playwrights